Ivan Hilgert is a former Czechoslovak slalom canoeist who competed from the mid-1980s to the early 1990s. He won a bronze medal in the K-1 team event at the 1983 ICF Canoe Slalom World Championships in Meran.

His wife Marcela Hilgertová is also a former slalom canoeist and medalist from world championships.

References

Czechoslovak male canoeists
Living people
Year of birth missing (living people)
Medalists at the ICF Canoe Slalom World Championships